Johann Christoph Bach (baptised  – 31 March 1703) was a German composer and organist of the Baroque period. He was born at Arnstadt, the son of Heinrich Bach, Johann Sebastian Bach's first cousin once removed and the first cousin of J.S. Bach's father, Johann Ambrosius Bach. He was also the uncle of Maria Barbara Bach, J. S. Bach's first wife and second cousin. Johann Christoph married Maria Elisabeth Wiedemann in 1667. They had seven children, including four sons who became musicians: Johann Nicolaus (10 October 1669 – 4 November 1753), Johann Christoph Jr. (29 August 1676 – 1738), Johann Friedrich (1682–1730), and Johann Michael (1685–unknown). He is not to be confused with Johann Sebastian Bach's son, Johann Christoph Friedrich Bach.

Johann Christoph had a reputation as a composer that was only equalled by that of Johann Sebastian within the Bach family during his lifetime. He was organist at Eisenach and later a member of the court chamber orchestra there. His brother, Johann Michael Bach (Johann Sebastian Bach's father-in-law and Maria Barbara's father), was also a composer. Some of the works were later attributed to Johann Sebastian, but were recently recognized as written by Johann Christoph. One of the most famous works is the cantata , based on the Song of Solomon. His 4-part chorale prelude "An Wasserflüssen Babylon" has the same kind of expressive dissonances, with suspensions, as his well known Lamento: Ach, daß ich Wassers g'nug hätte, a church cantata for alto and strings.

Despite his success as a musician, Johann Christoph experienced financial difficulties. Johann Christoph had his portrait painted in oil several times, including the well-known portrait of him that is on display in a Berlin museum. Johann Christoph was heavily in debt when he died at Eisenach. He died just ten days after his wife Maria died.

Johann Sebastian Bach, raised by his eldest brother, described him in his Genealogy (1735) as "the profound composer", thus hinting at his reputation, not just within the family, but within society.

See also
Bach family
 Altbachisches Archiv

References

External links

1642 births
1703 deaths
People from Schwarzburg-Sondershausen
Johann Christoph
German classical composers
German male composers
German Baroque composers
Organists and composers in the North German tradition
German male organists
German classical organists
Pupils of Johann Pachelbel
18th-century keyboardists
Male classical organists